First Snowfall is a 2013 Italian drama film directed by Andrea Segre. The film premiered in competition at the 70th Venice International Film Festival.

Cast

Matteo Marchel: Michele Fongher
Jean-Christophe Folly: Dani
Anita Caprioli: Elisa
Giuseppe Battiston: Fabio
Peter Mitterrutzner: Pietro Fongher

See also
Movies about immigration to Italy

References

External links

2013 films
Italian drama films
2013 drama films
Films about immigration
2010s Italian films